The Baltimore Charm was a team in the Legends Football League with home games at 1st Mariner Arena in Baltimore, Maryland. They began their inaugural 2010–2011 season in the Lingerie Football League on September 17, 2010, and finished with a 1–3 record. Baltimore entered its second season in the LFL's Eastern Conference in September 2011, ending with a 2–2 record. The league rebranded before the 2013 season as the Legends Football League.

On January 27, 2015, the league announced that Charm had suspended operations after four seasons with plans to return in 2016 following a move to the Washington, D.C./Northern Virginia market. The relocated team was to be called the Washington Warriorettes, but continually postponed its inaugural season.

Roster

2010–2011 schedule

2011–2012 schedule

2013 schedule

References

External links
 

American football teams in Baltimore
Defunct American football teams in Maryland
Legends Football League US teams
American football teams established in 2010
American football teams disestablished in 2015
2010 establishments in Maryland
2015 disestablishments in Maryland
Women's sports in Maryland